The Vogulka is a river in Sverdlovsk Oblast, Russia, a left tributary of Sylva which in turn is a tributary of Chusovaya. The main tributaries are the Maly Lip, Bolshoy Lip, Biz, Yurmys, and Kuara (right).

References 

Rivers of Sverdlovsk Oblast